Events in the year 1979 in Belgium.

Incumbents
Monarch: Baudouin
Prime Minister: Paul Vanden Boeynants (to 3 April); Wilfried Martens (from 3 April)

Events
 13 June – In Marckx v Belgium the European Court of Human Rights finds for the plaintiff, Paula Marckx, that Belgian inheritance law is unfair to unmarried mothers and their children.
 25 June – Red Army Faction fail to assassinate Alexander Haig, Supreme Allied Commander of NATO, with a bomb in Casteau

Publications
 Rita Lejeune and Jacques Stiennon (eds.), La Wallonie, le Pays et les Hommes: Lettres, Arts, Culture, vol. 2 (La Renaissance du Livre, Brussels)

Births
19 March – Stan Van Samang, actor and singer

Deaths
 11 February – Marie Delcourt (born 1891), classicist
 25 February – Marguerite Massart (born 1900), engineer
 10 May – Louis Paul Boon (born 1912), novelist

References

 
1970s in Belgium
Belgium
Years of the 20th century in Belgium
Belgium